Kushan-e Mirza Rahim (also Romanized as Kūshan-e Mīrzā Raḥīm) is a village in Bavil Rural District, in the Central District of Osku County, East Azerbaijan Province, Iran. At the 2006 census, its population was 81, in 24 families.

References 

Populated places in Osku County